Growler may refer to:

Places
Growler Mine Area, Arizona, United States

People
 "Growler" (calypsonian), Trinidad and Tobago calypsonian singer Errol Duke, also "The Mighty Growler"
 "The Growler", a nickname for Irish hurler Sean Daly

Fictional characters
 Growler, a house robot in Robot Wars
 Growler, a unit type in VOR: The Maelstrom
 Officer Growler, a character from The Getalong Gang

Groups, organizations, companies
 The Growlers, an American band
 Growler Manufacturing and Engineering, an American manufacturing firm
 Kalamazoo Growlers, a collegiate summer baseball team
 Newfoundland Growlers, a minor league ice hockey team

Technology
 Growler (electrical device), a device for testing electric motors
 Growler, a sound-powered telephone used on U.S. Navy ships
 S-400 missile system or SA-21 Growler, a surface-to-air missile

Vehicles
 M1161 Growler, a military light ground vehicle
 Avro Shackleton, a military aircraft of the RAF and the South African Air Force
 Boeing EA-18G Growler, an electronic warfare jet fighter
 British Rail Class 37 or growler, a diesel locomotive
 Clarence (carriage) or growler
 Growler-E, a 2011 concept car by Vizualtech that evolved into the Lyonheart K sports car
 , several ships and submarines of the United States Navy

Other uses
 Growler (jug), a type of large beer bottle
 Growler, a Yorkshire pork pie
 Growler, a small iceberg or piece of drift ice that is barely visible above the surface of the water

See also

Growl (disambiguation)